Michelle Fairley (born  1964–1965) is an actress from Northern Ireland. She is best known for playing Catelyn Stark in the HBO series Game of Thrones (2011–2013). She has since appeared in the USA Network series Suits (2013), the Fox series 24: Live Another Day (2014), the science fiction series The Feed (2019), and the Sky Atlantic crime drama Gangs of London (2020–).

Early life
Fairley was born in Coleraine to parents Brian and Teresa Fairley, the second eldest of six children. Her father was a popular publican, owner of Fairley's Bar and several off-licences, in Northern Ireland during The Troubles, but Fairley remembers both Catholics and Protestants frequenting the pub.

Career
Fairley appeared in a number of British television shows, including The Bill, Holby City and Casualty.  Some of her earlier roles were as Cathy Michaels on ITV1's Inspector Morse in the episode titled "The Way Through The Woods" and as Nancy Phelan in Lovejoy in the episode 9 of Season 3 titled "Smoke Your Nose".

She took over the role of Mrs. Granger from Heather Bleasdale (who had played Mrs. Granger in Chamber of Secrets) in the Harry Potter and the Deathly Hallows films. From 2011 to 2013, Fairley starred as Catelyn Stark (née Tully) in the first three seasons of the HBO fantasy series Game of Thrones, replacing Jennifer Ehle who played the character in the original pilot episode.

Fairley joined the cast of the USA Network series Suits for its third season, playing the recurring role of Ava Hessington. She played Margot Al-Harazi in 24: Live Another Day on Fox. Her film roles included The Invisible Woman (2013) and In the Heart of the Sea (2015).

In 2017, it was announced Fairley would appear in a revival of Jim Cartwright's play Road at the Royal Court Theatre In 2018, she played Cassius in Julius Caesar at the Bridge Theatre, alongside David Calder, David Morrissey and Ben Whishaw. In 2019, Fairley led the Virgin Media and Amazon Prime science fiction series The Feed as Meredith Hatfield. As of June 2020, Fairley stars as Marian Wallace in the Sky Atlantic crime drama Gangs of London. She starred as Millie in the 2021 film Nobody Has To Know alongside Bouli Lanners. Fairley has an upcoming role as Princess Augusta in Queen Charlotte: A Bridgerton Story on Netflix.

Personal life 
Fairley has been based in London since 1986, and keeps a low public profile. She said in an interview with The Telegraph in 2015, that she made the decision to separate from her boyfriend of seven years in 2012. Since then, Fairley has had no known partners. Fairley said, in the same interview, that she "missed the gene" for motherhood. She never had the desire to have children like some of her siblings did.

While Fairley has worked on various American projects in the past, she has no love for Hollywood, and the West End theatres remain her home. She said that television and movies challenge her in a different way and make her "use a different muscle," but theatre is where she feels her best work is done, where she started her career, and where she hopes to "end up".

Filmography

Film

Television

Theatre

Awards and nominations

Notes

References

External links
 

Film actresses from Northern Ireland
Television actresses from Northern Ireland
Living people
People from Coleraine, County Londonderry
Stage actresses from Northern Ireland
20th-century actresses from Northern Ireland
21st-century actresses from Northern Ireland
British Shakespearean actresses
Year of birth missing (living people)